Edna Yost (November 16, 1889, Clearfield County, Pennsylvania - September 10, 1971, New York City) wrote articles, poems, short stories, and books.  She was one of the first authors to write books focusing on the achievements of women in science, such as American Women of Science (1943), American Women of Nursing (1947) and Women of Modern Science (1959). She also worked with Lillian Moller Gilbreth to research and write about ways to improve the environment for people with disabilities.

Early life and education
Edna Yost was born on November 16, 1889 to Lewis and Laura Candace (Miller) Yost of Clearfield County, Pennsylvania. She grew up in Houtzdale, Pennsylvania. 
She received her A.B. degree from Allegheny College in 1913. She was invited to join Phi Beta Kappa and the women's fraternity Kappa Kappa Gamma and became a member of the American Association of University Women.

Career
Yost taught mathematics and English at Johnstown High School in Johnstown, Pennsylvania from 1913 to 1916. She then moved to New York City.

Yost became a member of the Woman's Press Club of New York City. She was involved in public health work for wounded servicemen. She served on the executive of the War Work Council of the Young Women's Christian Association from 1917 to 1919, and was an editorial assistant on the YWCA's Association Monthly. She worked as an editorial assistant on the American Journal of Public Health, published by the American Public Health Association, from 1919 to 1921. She also did editorial work for the American Society of Mechanical Engineers in New York from 1921 to 1925. She wrote articles for the Dictionary of American Biography as well as magazine articles, poems, short stories, and books.

She spent summers at the MacDowell Colony for creative artists in Peterborough, New Hampshire in 1929 and 1930.

In 1944, Yost worked with Lillian Moller Gilbreth, the first woman engineering professor at Purdue University, to research and write about improving the environment for people with disabilities. Their work was directly relevant to injured servicemen returning from World War II. They published two books, Normal Lives for the Disabled''' (1944) and Straight Talk to Disabled Veterans (1945). The books argued that it was possible for disabled persons to have a productive working life. Normal Lives was described as "a great help in laying a general foundation for the basic adjustment of a disabled individual".  Yost also went on to write a biography of Frank and Lillian Gilbreth, efficiency experts who applied scientific management techniques to a wide variety of tasks.

Yost is best remembered for her collections of biographies, focusing on the lives of men and women in the fields of science, nursing, and technology. They were generally targeted at young people, to inspire them to work in those areas. Yost was one of the first authors to focus on writing books about the achievements of women in science. Through American Women of Science (1943), American Women of Nursing (1947) and Women of Modern Science (1959), she hoped to inspire other women with the possibilities of careers like the ones she described.  She wrote that she herself had felt the lack of role models when she was a young woman, at a time when little if any biographical material was available about women.

Ida Tarbell reviewed American Women of Science positively for The New York Times, saying "Women who would know the best and highest of these achievements of their sex in science and the routes they took to them cannot do better than read this honest, direct and always interesting piece of work." Library Journal reviewed Women of Modern Science'' as "a positive contribution to the current pleas for more scientific and technical training, since it describes how some women scientists chose their life work and what they have been able to accomplish."

Awards
In 1945, Yost was awarded an honorary Doctorate of Letters (Litt.D.) from  Allegheny College, which she had attended.

Death
Yost died September 10, 1971, in New York City.

Bibliography

References

1889 births
1971 deaths
Allegheny College alumni
20th-century American poets
20th-century American short story writers
American women poets
American women short story writers
Writers from Pennsylvania
20th-century American women writers